Sredny Kharlun (Dunda Kharlan) is a rural locality (an ulus) in Bichursky District, Republic of Buryatia, Russia. The population was 395 as of 2010. There are 5 streets.

Geography 
Sredny Kharlun is located 56 km west of Bichura (the district's administrative centre) by road. Bolshoy Lug is the nearest rural locality.

References 

Rural localities in Bichursky District